François Maesschalck (born 19 October 1921) was a Belgian water polo player. He competed in the men's tournament at the 1952 Summer Olympics.

See also
 Belgium men's Olympic water polo team records and statistics
 List of men's Olympic water polo tournament goalkeepers

References

External links
 

1921 births
Possibly living people
Belgian male water polo players
Water polo goalkeepers
Olympic water polo players of Belgium
Water polo players at the 1952 Summer Olympics
Sportspeople from Brussels
20th-century Belgian people